Kingseat is a rural community between Karaka and Waiuku located on the Manukau Harbour in Auckland, New Zealand.

Development 
Kingseat was originally part of Patumahoe and was not actually recognised as a specific area until a mental hospital known as Kingseat Hospital was built there in February 1931. The local area around it then became generally became known as Kingseat. While still predominantly rural, with dairy farms and thoroughbred studs,  large blocks of land are being sold off for subdivision and commercial development. Local infrastructure is minimal, with the nearest shops being at Patumahoe (seven minutes away) or Karaka (ten minutes away).

Demographics
Kingseat is part of the larger Kingseat-Karaka statistical area.

Kingseat had a population of 579 at the 2018 New Zealand census, an increase of 105 people (22.2%) since the 2013 census, and an increase of 150 people (35.0%) since the 2006 census. There were 168 households, comprising 297 males and 288 females, giving a sex ratio of 1.03 males per female, with 132 people (22.8%) aged under 15 years, 111 (19.2%) aged 15 to 29, 294 (50.8%) aged 30 to 64, and 36 (6.2%) aged 65 or older.

Ethnicities were 76.2% European/Pākehā, 26.4% Māori, 10.4% Pacific peoples, 2.6% Asian, and 3.6% other ethnicities. People may identify with more than one ethnicity.

Although some people chose not to answer the census's question about religious affiliation, 56.5% had no religion, 30.1% were Christian, 1.0% had Māori religious beliefs and 3.6% had other religions.

Of those at least 15 years old, 60 (13.4%) people had a bachelor's or higher degree, and 96 (21.5%) people had no formal qualifications. 87 people (19.5%) earned over $70,000 compared to 17.2% nationally. The employment status of those at least 15 was that 237 (53.0%) people were employed full-time, 63 (14.1%) were part-time, and 24 (5.4%) were unemployed.

References

Populated places in the Auckland Region
Populated places around the Manukau Harbour